Jonathan O'Brien (born 28 December 1971) is a former Irish Sinn Féin politician who served as a Teachta Dála (TD) for the Cork North-Central constituency from 2011 to 2020.

Early life 
O'Brien moved to Morecambe, Lancashire in the early 1970's, where he lived for "six or seven years." He played for Rockmount A.F.C and made the Cork Schoolboys team. He was a teammate of Roy Keane.

Political career and activities 
He was a member of Cork City Council from 2000 to 2011. O'Brien also has a sporting background. He is a former board member and chairman of Cork City Football Club, having been a founding member of the supporters' trust, FORAS. He is also a member of St. Vincent's GAA Club.

O'Brien was criticised by the Minister of Education Ruairi Quinn over his position on the Household Charge. O'Brien responded by saying he had been elected to implement just and fair laws, and described the household tax as being neither.

He was the Sinn Féin Junior Spokesperson for Finance, and Public Expenditure and Reform.

On 6 January 2020, he announced that he would not contest the next general election.

References

External links
Jonathan O'Brien's page on the Sinn Féin website

 

1971 births
Living people
Local councillors in Cork (city)
Members of the 31st Dáil
Members of the 32nd Dáil
Sinn Féin TDs (post-1923)